Elizabeth is a feminine given name, a variation of the Hebrew name , meaning "My God is an oath" or "My God is abundance", as rendered in the Septuagint.

Occurrence in the Bible 
"Elizabeth" appears in the Hebrew Bible as the name of Aaron's wife ("Elisheva" in the Hebrew Bible), and in the New Testament as the name of the wife of the priest Zechariah and mother of John the Baptist. It has also been the name of several saints and queens.

Statistics 
The name has many variants in use across the world and has been in consistent use worldwide. 'Elizabeth' was the tenth most popular name given to baby girls in the United States in 2007 and has been among the 25 most popular names given to girls in the United States for the past 100 years. It is the only name that remained in the top ten US girls' names list from 1925 to 1972.

In the early 21st century, 'Elizabeth' has been among the top 50 names given to girls in the past 10 years born in England and Wales, as well Canada and Australia, and has been in the top 100 most popular names given to baby girls born in Scotland and Ireland. 'Elizaveta', a Russian form of the name, has been in the top 10 names given to baby girls born in Moscow, Russia in the past 10 years. The name is also popular in Ukraine and Belarus.

Name variants

Full name
  (Albanian)
  (Arabic)
  (Tongan)
  (Māori)
  (Shesan)
 Aelswith, Aelswithia, Elesabeth, Elyzabeth (English)
  (Coptic)
 ,  (Czech)
  (Slovak)
  (Scottish Gaelic)
  (Manx)
  (Breton)
  (Portuguese)
 ,  (Estonian)
  (Hawaiian)
  (Turkish)
Elizabeti (Swahili)
 Elisabet (Catalan), (Danish), (Finnish), (German), (Spanish), (Swedish)
  (Icelandic)
  (Romanian)
 ,  (French)
 Elisabeth (Catalan), (Danish), (Dutch), (German), (Norwegian), (Swedish)
  (Esperanto)
  (Italian)
 ,  (Greek)
  (Bulgarian)
  (Belarusian)
  (Hebrew)
  (Basque)
 Elizabeta (Albanian), (Croatian), (Bosnian), (Slovene)
 Elizabete (Basque), (Latvian)
  (Korean)
  (Malayalam)
  (Danish)
 Elsbeth (Dutch), (German), (Scots), (Swiss German)
  (Scots)
  (Vietnamese)
 , (Serbian), (Macedonian)
 , (Russian)
   Ukrainian
  (Lithuanian)
  (Polish)
  (Japanese)
  (Hungarian)
 Isabella (Italian), (Dutch)
 Isabelle (French), (Dutch)
 Isabel (Spanish), (Dutch)
 ,  (Armenian)
  (Chinese Simplified)
  (Chinese Traditional)
  (Bengali)
  (Gujarati)
  (Hindi)
  (Kannada)
  (Marathi)
  (Mongolian)
  (Nepali)
  (Persian)
  (Punjabi)
  (Tamil)
  (Telugu)
  (Thai)
  (Urdu)
  (Yiddish)

Diminutives
  (Spanish)
  (Hungarian)
  (French)
 Isabel (Catalan), (English), (Norwegian), (Portuguese), (Spanish), (French)
 Isabela (Spanish), (Portuguese)
 Isabell (English), (German), (Norwegian)
 Isabella (Dutch), (English), (Italian), (Norwegian), (Polish), (Spanish), (Swedish)
 Isabelle (English), (French), (German)
  (Vietnamese)
  (Manx)
 Isbel, Isebella, Izabelle, Lisabeth, Lizabeth, Sabella, Sissy (English)
  (Scottish Gaelic)
  (Scots)
  (Irish)
 Izabel (Portuguese (archaic)), (Spanish), (Polish)
 Izabela (Czech), (Polish)
 Izabella (Hungarian), (Polish)
Lettie (Greek), (Latin)
  (Dutch)
  (Italian)
 Lisbet (Danish), (Norwegian), (Swedish)
 Lisbeth (German), (Norwegian), (Danish)
  (Spanish, chiefly Latin American)
  (Galician)
  (Slovene)
  (Armenian)
  (Greek)
  (Serbian)
  (Russian), (Serbian)
  (Ukrainian), (Belarusian)
  (Ukrainian)
  (Georgian)

First half
  (Danish)
  (Malayalam)
  (Portuguese)
  (Manx)
  (Irish language)
  (Polish)
  (Afrikaans)
  (Norwegian)
 Elly (English), (Dutch)
 Eli (Catalan), (English), (Spanish)
  (Malayalam)
  (Finnish)
  (German)
 Elisa (Finnish), (Italian), (Norwegian), (Spanish), (Portuguese)
  (French)
 Eliška (Czech) and (Slovak)
  (Bulgarian)
  (Georgian)
 Elissa (English), (Norwegian)
 Eliza (Albanian), (English), (Polish)
 Elka (Albanian), (Polish)
 Ellee, Elsie, Elyse, Leesa, Lizzy, Liz, Lysette (English)
 Elli (Finnish), (German)
 Ellie (Origin unknown)
  (Dutch)
 Elsa (Catalan), (Dutch), (Finnish), (German), (Italian), (Norwegian), (Portuguese), (Spanish), (Swedish)
 Else (Danish), (German), (Norwegian)
  (Estonian)
  (Hebrew)
 Elzė (Lithuanian)
  (Hungarian)
  (German)
 Ilse (Dutch), (German)
 Isa (Spanish), (Portuguese)
  (Spanish)
 Izzie (English)
 Izzy (English), (Norwegian)
  (Serbian)
 Lies (Dutch), (German)
 Lieselotte (German), (Swedish)
 Liisa, Liisi, (Estonian), (Finnish)
 Lila (mostly for kids) (Catalan), (Polish)
 Lili (French), (Polish)
  (Indonesian)
 Lis (Danish), (English), (Norwegian), (Swedish)
 Lisa (Catalan), (Danish), (English), (German), (Italian), (Norwegian), (Swedish), (Portuguese), (Spanish), (Polish), (Welsh)
 Lisanne (Dutch), (English), (Norwegian)
 Lise (French), (Norwegian)
 Liselotte (Danish), (German), (Norwegian)
  (Swedish)
 Liza (English), (Polish), (Russian), (Ukrainian)
  (Latvian)
 Lizzie (English), (Norwegian)

Middle
  (French)
 Ibbie, Issy, Libby, Liddy (English)
  (archaic, rural areas) (Catalan)
  (German)

Second half
  (Scottish Gaelic)
  (Catalan)
  (Spanish)
  (Italian)
 Bess, Bessie, Beth, Betsy, Betsey, Bette, Bettie, Betty, Bettye, Bitsy, Buffy, Zabeth (English)
  (Czech)
  (Welsh)
  (Slovak)
  (Italian)
  (German)
 Bettina (German), (Italian)
  (Estonian)

People with the given name

Empresses regnant
 Elizabeth of Russia (1709–1762)

Empresses consort
 Elisabeth Christine of Brunswick-Wolfenbüttel (1691–1750), consort of Emperor Charles VI
 Elizabeth Alexeievna (Louise of Baden) (1779–1826), wife of Tsar Alexander I of Russia
 Empress Elisabeth of Austria (1837–1898), wife of Austrian Emperor Franz Joseph I, also known as Empress Elisabeth or "Sisi"
 Queen Elizabeth The Queen Mother (1900–2002), wife of the King-Emperor George VI of the United Kingdom
 Empress Wanrong (1906–1946), last Empress of China, also known as Elizabeth, the English name her tutor gave her

Queens regnant
 Elizabeth I (1533–1603), queen of England and Ireland
 Elizabeth II (1926–2022), queen of the United Kingdom and other Commonwealth realms

Queens consort
 Elisabeth of Swabia (1203–1235), also known as Beatrice of Swabia, queen consort of Castile and León
 Elisabeth of Bavaria, Queen of Germany, queen consort of Germany, Jerusalem and Sicily
 Elisabeth of Brunswick-Lüneburg (1230–1266), queen consort of Germany
 Elizabeth the Cuman (1239/1240–1290), queen consort and regent of Hungary
 Elizabeth of Hungary, Queen of Serbia (1255–1313), queen consort of Serbia
 Elizabeth of Sicily, Queen of Hungary (1261–1303), queen consort of Hungary
 Elizabeth of Carinthia, Queen of Germany, queen consort of Germany
 Elizabeth of Aragon (1271–1336), queen consort, queen dowager and queen mother of Portugal, also known as Saint Elizabeth of Portugal
 Elisabeth Richeza of Poland (1286–1335), queen consort of Bohemia and Poland
 Elizabeth de Burgh (1289–1327), queen consort of Scotland
 Elisabeth of Bohemia (1292–1330), queen consort of Bohemia
 Elizabeth of Carinthia, Queen of Sicily (1298–1352), queen consort and regent of Sicily
 Elizabeth of Holstein-Rendsburg, junior queen consort of Denmark, wife of Eric Christoffersen
 Elizabeth of Poland, Queen of Hungary (1305–1380), queen consort of Hungary, regent of Poland
 Elizabeth of Bosnia, queen of Hungary and Poland
 Elizabeth of Pomerania (1347–1393), queen consort and queen dowager of the Romans, Bohemia, Italy and Burgundy
 Elisabeth of Nuremberg (1358–1411), queen consort of the Romans
 Isabeau of Bavaria, also known as Elisabeth of Bavaria-Ingolstadt, queen consort of France
 Elizabeth Granowska, queen consort of Poland
 Elizabeth of Luxembourg (1409–1442), queen consort of the Romans, Hungary, Bohemia and Croatia
 Elisabeth of Habsburg (1436–1505), queen consort, queen dowager and queen mother of Poland
 Elizabeth Woodville, queen consort of Edward IV
 Elizabeth of York (1466–1503), queen consort of King Henry VII of England
 Elizabeth of Austria (1526–1545), queen consort of Poland
 Elisabeth of Valois (1545-1568), queen consort of Spain
 Elisabeth of Austria, Queen of France (1554–1592), queen consort of France
 Elizabeth Stuart, Queen of Bohemia (1596–1662), daughter of James VI and I of Scotland and England, the "Winter Queen" of Bohemia
 Elisabeth of France (1602–1644), queen consort of Spain and Portugal
 Elisabeth Farnese (1692–1766), queen consort, queen dowager and queen mother of Spain
 Elisabeth Therese of Lorraine (1711–1741), queen consort of Sardinia, Cyprus, Jerusalem and Armenia
 Elisabeth Christine of Brunswick-Wolfenbüttel-Bevern (1715–1797), queen consort and queen dowager of Prussia
 Kaʻahumanu, also known as Elizabeth Kaʻahumanu, queen consort and queen regent of Hawaiʻi
 Elisabeth Ludovika of Bavaria (1801–1873), queen consort of Prussia
 Kīnaʻu, also known as Elizabeth Kīnaʻu, queen consort, queen regent and dowager queen of Hawaiʻi
 Elisabeth of Bavaria (1837–1898), queen consort of Hungary, Croatia, and Bohemia
 Elisabeth of Wied (1843–1916), queen consort and queen dowager of Romania
 Elisabeth of Bavaria, Queen of Belgium (1876–1965), wife of King Albert I of Belgium
 Elisabeth of Romania (1894–1956), queen consort of King George II of Greece
 Queen Elizabeth The Queen Mother (1900–2002), queen consort, queen dowager and queen mother of the United Kingdom

Princesses
 Elisabeth of the Palatinate (1618–1680), Bohemian princess and philosopher
 Princess Élisabeth of France (Élisabeth Philippine Marie Hélène; 1764–1794), sister of Louis XVI of France, also known as Madame Élisabeth
 Princess Elizabeth of the United Kingdom (1770–1840), daughter of George III
 Princess Elisabeth of Hesse and by Rhine (1864–1918) (1864–1918), Russian grand duchess and Orthodox martyr, wife of Grand Duke Sergei Alexandrovich of Russia and granddaughter of Queen Victoria
 Elizabeth Bagration (1880–1915), Georgian royal princess
 Princess Elizabeth of Greece and Denmark (1904–1955), later Countess of Toerring-Jettenbach, the middle daughter of Prince Nicholas of Greece and Grand Duchess Elena Vladimirovna of Russia
 Princess Elisabeth of Denmark (1935–2018)
 Princess Elizabeth of Yugoslavia (born 1936)
 Princess Elisabeth, Duchess of Brabant (born 2001), oldest child and heiress apparent of Philippe, King of the Belgians

Other aristocrats
 Elizabeth of Lancaster, Duchess of Exeter (1363–1426), younger daughter and second surviving child of John of Gaunt, 1st Duke of Lancaster and Blanche of Lancaster
 Elisabeth von Matsch, (1380s—around 1439), last countess of Toggenburg
 Elizabeth Báthory (1560–1614), niece of the Polish King Stephen Báthory; Hungarian countess and murderer

Saints
 Elizabeth (1st century BC), the mother of John the Baptist
 Elisabeth of Schönau (1129–1164), a German Benedictine visionary
 Elizabeth of Hungary (1207–1231), the daughter of King Andrew II of Hungary
 Elizabeth of Aragon or Elizabeth of Portugal (1271–1336), Queen consort of Portugal
 Elizabeth Ann Seton (1774–1821), the first canonized "American" saint
 Princess Elisabeth of Hesse and by Rhine (1864–1918), Eastern Orthodox saint and wife of Grand Duke Sergei Alexandrovich of Russia
 Elizabeth of the Trinity (1880–1906), French Carmelite nun

Others
 Elizabeth Andrews (1882–1960), first woman organiser of the Labour Party in Wales
 Elizabeth Angrnaqquaq (1916–2003), Canadian Inuk textile artist
 Elizabeth Arden (1881–1966), American businesswoman
 Elizabeth Mary Aslin (1923–1989), English art historian, administrator, author and lecturer
 Elizabeth Banks (born 1974), American actress
 Elizabeth Barrett Browning (1806–1861), Victorian era poet
 Elizabeth Beckley, British astronomical photographer
 Élisabeth Bergeron (1851–1936), Canadian Venerable religious servant
 Lady Elizabeth Philippa Biddulph (1834-1916), English humanitarian, temperance leader; Woman of the Bedchamber to Queen Victoria
 Elizabeth Blackadder (1931–2021), Scottish painter and printmaker
 Elizabeth Blackwell (1821–1910), the first woman to receive a medical degree in the United States
 Elizabeth Baker Bohan (1849–1930), British-born American author, journalist, artist, social reformer
 Elizabeth Joanna Bosman (1894–1963), South African author, first Afrikaner novelist published in English
 Elizabeth Bowen Thompson (1812/1813–1869), British missionary who founded of the British Syrian Schools
 Elizabeth Bruenig (born 1990), American writer and opinion columnist for The New York Times
 Elizabeth Cady Stanton (1815–1902), American suffragist, social activist, abolitionist, and leading figure of the early women's rights movement
 Elizabeth Carter (1717–1806), English poet, classicist, writer, translator, linguist, polymath
 Elisabeth Cavazza (1849–1926), American author, journalist, music critic
 Elizabeth Williams Champney (1850–1922), American writer
 Elizabeth Marney Conner (1856–?), American dramatic reader, educator, author 
 Elizabeth Craig-McFeely (born 1927), British Director of the Women's Royal Naval Service
 Elizabeth Cromwell (1598–1665), the wife of Oliver Cromwell and Her Highness the Lady Protector
 Elizabeth Litchfield Cunnyngham (1831-1911), American missionary and church worker
 Elizabeth Daily (born 1961), American actress and singer
 Elizabeth Otis Dannelly (1838–1896), American poet 
 Elizabeth David (1913–1992), British cookery writer
 Elizabeth Debicki (born 1990), Australian actress
 Elizabeth Jessup Eames (1813–1856), American writer
 Elisabeth Ebeling (1946–2020), German film and stage actress
 Elizabeth Edwards (1949–2010), American attorney, a best-selling author and a health care activist
 Elisabeth Erke (born 1962), Norwegian Sami educator and politician
 Elizabeth Hawley Everett (1857-1940), American clubwoman, suffragist, author, magazine founder/editor, school principal, superindent of schools
 Elizabeth Sterling Haynes (1897–1957), Canadian theatre activist
 Elizabeth Filippouli, Greek journalist-turned-entrepreneur, founder of the international non-profit think tank Global Thinkers Forum
 Elizabeth Fraser (born 1963), Scottish singer
 Elizabeth Fry (1780–1845), English prison reformer
 Elizabeth Gaskell (1810–1865), British novelist and short story writer
 Elizabeth Gillies (born 1993), American Broadway actress
 Elizabeth Ayton Godwin (1817–1889), English hymnwriter, religious poet
 Elizabeth Putnam Gordon (1851–1933), American temperance advocate, author
 Elizabeth Greenhill (bookbinder), (1907–2006), English bookbinder
 Elizabeth Greenwood (1873–1961), New Zealand photographer
Elisabeth Griffith, American historian, educator, and activist

 Elizabeth Haigh (born 1988), Singaporean chef
 Elizabeth Amherst Hale (1774–1826), Canadian Watercolor Artist
 Elizabeth Mae "Lzzy" Hale (born 1983), American musician, singer, songwriter. Lead singer and rhythm guitarist for Halestorm
 Elizabeth Schuyler Hamilton (1757–1854), American philanthropist and wife of United States founding father Alexander Hamilton
 Elizabeth Boynton Harbert (1843–1925), American author, lecturer, reformer philanthropist
 Elizabeth Harrower (disambiguation), several people
 Elizabeth Haselwood, English silversmith
 Elisabeth Hasselbeck (born 1977), American actress
 Elizabeth Henstridge (born 1987), English actress, model, and director.
 Elizabeth Hoare (1915–2001), English church furnisher and actress
 Elizabeth Holmes (born 1984), American fraudster who founded Theranos
 Elizabeth Hulette aka Miss Elizabeth (1960–2003), professional wrestling manager
 Elizabeth Hughes Gossett (1907–1981), daughter of American politician Charles Evans Hughes
 Elizabeth Hurley (born 1965), British actress and model
 Elizabeth Jaranyi (1918–1998), Holocaust survivor and writer
 Elisabeth Jastrow (1890–1981), German-born classical archaeologist
 Elisabetta Keller (1891–1969), Swiss-Italian artist
 Elizabeth Kelly (born 1921), British actress
 Elizabeth "Ellie" Kemper (born 1980), American actress and comedian
 Elizabeth Kenny (1880–1952), Australian nurse
 Elizabeth Lail (born 1992), American actress
 Elizabeth Lambert, American writer of romance
 Elizabeth Lazebnik, Latvian Canadian filmmaker
 Elizabeth "Betty" Washington Lewis (1733–1797), sister of George Washington
 Elizabeth A. Lynn (born 1946), American writer most known for fantasy and to a lesser extent science fiction
 Elizabeth Roberts MacDonald (1864-1922), Canadian writer, suffragist
 Elisabeth MacIntyre, (1916–2004), Australian writer and illustrator
 Elizabeth Eunice Marcy (1821–1911), American author, activist, and social reformer
 Elizabeth Margosches, American statistician
 Elisabeth Marschall (1886–1947), head nurse at Ravensbrück concentration camp, later executed for war crimes
 Elizabeth Louisa Foster Mather (1815–1882), American writer 
 Elizabeth McGovern (born 1961), American actress
 Elizabeth Meckes (1980–2020), American mathematician
 Elizabeth Miller (1878–1961), American novelist
 Elizabeth Mitchell (1972–1998), American shag dancer
 Elizabeth Monk (1898–1980), Canadian lawyer and city councillor
 Elizabeth Monroe (1768–1830), First Lady of the United States (1817–1825)
 Elizabeth "Eliza" Monroe Hay (1786–1840), American socialite
 Elizabeth Montgomery (1933–1995), American actress
 Elizabeth Moore (1894–1976), American local historian and preservationist
 Elizabeth Martha Olmsted (1825–1910), American poet
 Elizabeth Murdoch (1909–2012), Australian philanthropist
 Elisabeth Murray (1909–1998), English biographer and educationist
 Elizabeth Mystakidou (born 1977), Greek taekwondo athlete
 Elizabeth Olsen (born 1989), American actress
 Elizabeth Perkins (born 1960), American actress
 Elizabeth Pesiridou (born 1992), Greek hurdler
 Elizabeth Power (born 1941), English actress
 Elizabeth Ramsey (1931–2015), Filipina comedian, singer, and actress
 Élisabeth Renaud (1846-1932), co-founder, Groupe Feministe Socialiste
 Elizabeth Rose (died 1130), Benedictine nun at Chelles, France
 Elizabeth Lownes Rust (1835–1899), American philanthropist, humanitarian, Christian missionary
 Elizabeth Scott (1708–1776), English-American poet, hymnwriter
 Elizabeth Eggleston Seelye (1858–1923), American writer
 Elizabeth Simcoe (1762–1850), British artist and diarist, wife of John Graves Simcoe
 Elisabeth Sladen (1946–2011), English actress
 Elizabeth Smart (born 1987), American female activist and contributor for ABC News (American Broadcasting Corporation)
 Elizabeth Willisson Stephen (1856-1925), American author
 Elizabeth Stride (1843–1888), the third murder victim of Jack the Ripper
 Elizabeth Swados (1951–2016), American writer, composer, musician, and theatre director
 Elizabeth Taylor (1932–2011), British-American actress
 Elizabeth Terry (born c. 1943), American chef
 Elizabeth Underwood (1794–1858), pioneering Australian land owner
 Elizabeth Warren (born 1949), American politician and United States Senator from Massachusetts
 Elizabeth Lowe Watson (1842–1927), American lecturer, suffragist
 Elizabeth Wettlaufer (born 1967), Canadian nurse and serial killer
 Elizabeth Woolridge Grant (born 1985), real name of singer Lana Del Rey
 Elizabeth Young (author), contemporary romance writer
 Elizabeth Young (journalist) (1950–2001), literary critic and author 
 Elizabeth Zachariadou (1931–2018), Greek historian
 Elizabeth Zimmerman (born 1948), Filipina former flight attendant and former wife of Philippine president Rodrigo Duterte
 Elizabeth Zimmermann (1910–1999), British-born knitter

Fictional characters
 Elizabeth, main character and A.I. companion in the video game BioShock Infinite
 Elizabeth, from the videogame Persona 3
 Elizabeth, a truck from the TV series Thomas and Friends
 Elizabeth, a muppet from the TV series Sesame Street
 Elizabeth Bennet, main character in the Jane Austen novel Pride and Prejudice
 Elizabeth Johnson, main character in the FX series American Horror Story: Hotel, portrayed by Lady Gaga
 Lizzy Bruin, best friend of Sister Bear from The Berenstain Bears
 Elizabeth "Z" Delgado, the Yellow Ranger from Power Rangers SPD
 Betty DeVille, wife of Howard DeVille and mother of Phil and Lil DeVille on Rugrats
 Elizabeth Jones, protagonist of the Lifetime movie Reviving Ophelia
 Elizabeth Keen, main character from the American TV series The Blacklist
 Elizabeth Lochley, main character in the 1990s science fiction TV series Babylon 5, and had appeared on the spin-off TV series Crusade.
 Elizabeth "Beth" March from Little Women by Louisa May Alcott
 Elizabeth "Lizzie" McGuire, main character of the teen sitcom Lizzie McGuire
 Elizabeth Midford, in the anime and manga Black Butler
 Elizabeth Poldark, from the novel and two BBC television series Poldark
 Betty Rubble, wife of Barney Rubble and adoptive mother of Bamm Bamm Rubble on The Flintstones
 Elizabeth Shaw, main character in Ridley Scott's movie Prometheus
 Effy Stonem, main character from the British teen drama Skins
 Elizabeth Swann, a main character in the film series Pirates of the Caribbean
 Elizabeth Thompson, main character in the anime Soul Eater
 Elizabeth Webber, on the daytime soap opera General Hospital
 Elizabeth Liones, main character in the manga The Seven Deadly Sins
 Elizabeth Sherman, from the Hellboy comic books
 Elizabeth Harmon, protagonist of the novel The Queen's Gambit
 Elizabeth 'Betsy' Braddock, from the X-men
 Elizabeth Weir (Stargate), main character in the TV series Stargate Atlantis
 Dr. Liz Wilson, the vet and Jon's love interest from Jim Davis's Garfield comic strip
 Elizabeth Afton, a main character from the Five Nights at Freddy’s franchise

See also
 Elizabeth Hernandez (disambiguation)
 , an unrelated Anglo-Saxon name, derived from the Old English  ('elf-strength'), superficially similar to 'Elspeth' and several other variants of 'Elizabeth'; more often rendered as 'Elfriede', 'Elfrida' or 'Alfreda'.

References

English feminine given names
Feminine given names
Hebrew feminine given names
Modern names of Hebrew origin